Monjas is a town, with a population of 13,541 (2018 census), and a municipality in the Jalapa department of Guatemala, approximately  from Guatemala City, Guatemala.

References

Municipalities of the Jalapa Department